Easter in Berlin also known as Easter Berlin, founded in 1975, is the biggest leather and fetish event in Europe. It takes place in Berlin every year at Easter (March or April).

History 
The meeting is organized by the members of the club BLF, Berlin Leder und Fetisch e.V. (English: Berlin Leather and Fetish).

Each year thousands of Leather-, Rubber-, Sportswear-, Skin- and Uniformlovers from all over the World come together to join different kinds of fetish events in Berlin. 
In the past, this event has elected their titleholder, German Mr Leather on Easter Sunday. 

The centre of Easter in Berlin is at Nollendorfplatz, a gay and queer neighborhood in the Western part of Berlin. 

The autumn leather and fetish event Folsom Europe is also held annually in the same neighborhood.
More gay festivals in Berlin include Berlin Pride and Kreuzberg Pride.

See also
Lesbian and Gay City Festival (Berlin)

References

External links 
 BLF (Berlin Leather & Fetish

LGBT events in Berlin
Pride parades in Germany
Culture in Berlin
Fetish subculture
Leather events
Tourist attractions in Berlin
Parades in Berlin
Annual events in Berlin
Spring (season) events in Germany